The Dapo Pond is a pond in Chishang Township, Taitung County, Taiwan.

History
The pond was originally called Dabi. In early years, the fish and shrimp found in Chishang came from Dapo area. During the Japanese rule of Taiwan, the pond had a surface area of 55 hectares and there were abundant fish and shrimp inside the water. Lotuses and water chestnuts also grew in the pond. After the handover of Taiwan from Japan to the Republic of China in 1945, the pond became one of the ten scenic sights of Taitung County under the title The Fishing Line of Chihshang. However, after the Large Dapo Drainage Ditch water conservation facility, natural silting and other factors, the surface area of the pond gradually shrinks.

Geology
Dapo Pond is an inland freshwater swamp. It was formed as a result of fault activity in Chishang. Its water comes from an underground stream located at the tip of the alluvial fan of Xinwulyu River. The pond river flows northward towards the lowlands, which then becomes the source of Xiuguluan River. Under the planning and revitalization efforts from Taitung County Government, the pond now has a surface area of around 20 hectares with another 20 hectares on its surrounding embankments and wetlands.

Features
The area around the lake features several facilities, such as bike routes, footpath, pavilions, fishing area, bird watching area and garden.

Activities
The area was the venue for the light show of the 2017 Taiwan International Balloon Festival.

Transportation
The lake is accessible within walking distance south east of Chishang Station of Taiwan Railways.

See also
 Geography of Taiwan
 List of lakes of Taiwan

References

Lakes of Taitung County
Lakes of Taiwan